The Jain Bunt are the Jainists of Bunt caste from Tulunaad area of India. It has been said that the Jain Bunts also have the highest per capita income in India. They have a feudal and martial race heritages, because of ties to the erstwhile royalty of the area.  They are classified as Other Backward Class (OBC) by the Government of Karnataka.

Origin
Some Jain Bunts are hereditary trustees and administrators of Hindu Temples, an example being at the Dharmasthala Temple, whose hereditary administrators are the Pergade family.

Tradition
Achieving moksha or liberation is the highest goal of life for the Jains. Jain monastics and renouncers of worldly life are highly revered, especially Bahubali, a king who turned into an ascetic. His virtues are greatly extolled in legends. Huge, monolithic statues have been erected by the Jain Bunts in his honor throughout their recorded history. The oldest among them is located in Karkala. Standing about 42 feet tall, it was erected by the Jain Bunt as per the wishes of a pontiff named Lalitakeerti in 1432. Another statue of Bahubali standing about 35 feet was erected in Venur in 1604 by the Jain Bunt ruler Timma Ajila. The most recently erected statue lies in Dharmasthala and is about 39 feet tall. Mahamastakabhisheka rituals are held once in 12 years at the site of these statues. Jain temples, called basadi and derasar, are numerous in the region and were built by various Jain Bunt rulers. The most famous among them is the Saavira Kambada Basadi located in Moodabidri. Jain Bunts are strict vegetarians and do not consume anything after sunset or eat root vegetables.

See also

Jainism in Karnataka

References

Tuluva
Jain communities
Mangalorean society
Bunt (community)
Tulu Nadu